The Triumph is a Nigerian English-language newspaper, published by the Triumph Publishing Company Limited and based in Kano, Kano State. It presently publishes a weekly edition with arrangements to return to publishing of the daily, weekend and Sunday editions as well as the publishing of its sister vernacular newspapers of Albishir and Alfijir.

The Triumph newspaper was established in June 1980. The company is solely owned by the Ministry of Information, Youths and Culture of the Kano State government. In February 2000, the Jigawa State Governor, Alhaji Ibrahim Saminu Turaki threatened to blacklist the Triumph Publishing Company because he alleged that it had published negative reports about Jigawa State, which had once been part of Kano State. In January 2009, Kano State allocated N8.9 million for the company's activities. In October 2012, the state government closed down the company for alleged unviability. The closure was later found to have political undertones.

The present government re-opened it and included in the 2018 budget and a pledge to acquire a modern digital printing machine for the company.

References

1980 establishments in Nigeria
English-language newspapers published in Africa
Mass media in Kano
Newspapers established in 1980
Weekly newspapers published in Nigeria